William Horace Quinton (9 January 1878 – 27 December 1912) was an Australian rules footballer who played with Geelong in the Victorian Football League (VFL).

Notes

External links 

1878 births
1912 deaths
Australian rules footballers from Victoria (Australia)
Geelong Football Club players
People educated at Geelong College